The 2015 Horizon League baseball tournament was held from May 20 through 23.  All six of the league's teams met in the double-elimination tournament held at Oil City Stadium in Whiting, Indiana.   earned the conference's automatic bid to the 2015 NCAA Division I baseball tournament.

Seeding and format
The league's six teams will be seeded one through six based on winning percentage, using conference games only.  They will then play a double-elimination tournament.

Bracket

Play-in games

Remaining bracket

All Tournament Team  

           P Dalton Lundeen - Valparaiso
           P E.J. Trapino   - Wright State
           C Sean Murphy    - Wright State
          1B Sam Koenig     - Wisconsin-Milwaukee
          2B Tell Taylor    - Wisconsin-Milwaukee
          SS Mitch Roman    - Wright State
          3B Nick Unes      - Wisconsin Milwaukee
          OF Tyler Detmer   - Illinois-Chicago
          OF Luke Meeteer   - Wisconsin-Milwaukee
          OF Ryan Fucci     - Wright State
          DH Mark Fowler    - Wright State

Tourney MVP
 Mark Fowler, Wright State

References

Tournament
Horizon League Baseball Tournament
Horizon League baseball tournament
Horizon League baseball tournament
College sports tournaments in Indiana
Baseball competitions in Indiana
Sports in Lake County, Indiana
Tourist attractions in Lake County, Indiana
Whiting, Indiana